The Albertina Foundation (Danish: Legatet Albertina) was a philanthropic foundation created by Carl Jacobsen in 1879 with  the aim of installing sculpture in the public realm, particularly in the parks, of Copenhagen, Denmark. The artworks include both casts of classical Roman and Greek statues and works by contemporary artists. The foundation is named after Bertel Thorvaldsen, who in Italy went by the name of Alberto.

History
The foundation was established on 19 October 1879. It was administrated by a board consisting of the founder and two other members appointed by the City Council and the Art Academy respectively. From the beginning, there were disagreements on the board as to what artworks to acquire. Jacobsen wanted contemporary French art while Ferdinand Meldahl, who represented the City Council, leaned towards Danish artists. As a compromise, 14 of the 15 sculptures which the foundation acquired during the first ten years of its existence were castings of classical works.

When Carl Jacobsen died in 1914, his oldest son, Holger Jacobsen, took over his seat on the board. Gradually, due to inflation, acquisitions dwindled. The foundation was finally dissolved on 19 November 2002, after 123 years of operations. The last funds were spent on Jørn Larsen's water feature on Bertel Thorvaldsens Plads in front of Thorvaldsens Museum.

List of statues

See also
 Ny Carlsberg Glyptotek

References

External links
 PDF about the foundation's history (in Danish)

Arts in Copenhagen
Danish sculpture
1879 establishments in Denmark
Organizations established in 1879